The Central District of Khalkhal County is in Ardabil province, Iran. At the 2006 census, its population was 64,037 in 15,600 households. The following census in 2011 counted 66,901 people in 18,299 households. At the latest census in 2016, the district had 61,122 inhabitants living in 18,347 households.

References 

Khalkhal County

Districts of Ardabil Province

Populated places in Ardabil Province

Populated places in Khalkhal County